In urology, voiding cystourethrography (VCUG) is a frequently performed technique for visualizing a person's urethra and urinary bladder while the person urinates (voids). It is used in the diagnosis of vesicoureteral reflux (kidney reflux), among other disorders.  The technique consists of catheterizing the person in order to fill the bladder with a radiocontrast agent, typically diatrizoic acid. Under fluoroscopy (real time x-rays) the radiologist watches the contrast enter the bladder and looks at the anatomy of the patient. If the contrast moves into the ureters and back into the kidneys, the radiologist makes the diagnosis of vesicoureteral reflux, and gives the degree of severity a score. The exam ends when the person voids while the radiologist is watching under fluoroscopy. Consumption of fluid promotes excretion of contrast media after the procedure. It is important to watch the contrast during voiding, because this is when the bladder has the most pressure, and it is most likely this is when reflux will occur.  Despite this detailed description of the procedure,  the technique had not been standardized across practices.

Uses
Some uses of this procedure are: to study the presence of vesicoureteric reflux, study of urethra during micturition, presence of bladder leak post surgery or trauma, and is used in urodynamic testing to assess urinary incontinence.

All males with recurrent UTIs (urinary tract infections) or abnormality on ultrasound if first UTI.
Females < 3 years of age with their first UTI.
Females < 5 years of age with febrile UTIs
Older females with pyelonephritis or recurrent UTIs
Suspected obstruction (e.g. bilateral hydronephrosis)
Suspected bladder trauma or rupture
 Vesico Vaginal/Vesico Colic fistula
Cystocele

Contraindications for voiding cystourethrogram is when the subject is having ongoing acute urinary tract infection.
Hypersensitivity to contrast media
Fever within the past 24 hours
Pregnancy

Procedure
Either high osmolar contrast agent such as diatrizoate or low osmolar contrast agent such as Iotalamic acid with concentration of 150 mg per ml can be used.

The urinary bladder is catheterised under aseptic technique. The contrast medium is slowly injected or dripped in slowly. The level of bladder filling is observed by taking intermittent images using fluoroscopy. The early filling of the bladder should be monitored carefully to detect any accidental placement of the catheter in distal ureter or vagina and to detect any reflux of contrast into the ureters. The bladder should be filled up with as much contrast as possible until the subject is unable to tolerate it or when there is no more contrast going into the bladder. If the subject is able to pee himself, then catheter can be removed for the subject to pee. If there is no confidence that the subject is able to pee, then urinary catheter should remain in place. It is more convenient for adults to pee in erect position with a urine receiver. Meanwhile, children can pee while lie down on table with a urine receiver. Infants and smaller children can lie down on table and pee on absorbent pads. For those children or infants with neuropathic bladder, pressure on the suprabic region can help them to pee.

Fluoroscopic spot images and videos are taken during micturition phase to detect any reflux. The lower ureter is best seen on anterior oblique position. In males, peeing should be done in oblique or lateral positions to visualise the whole of urethra. Finally, the whole abdomen is imaged to detect any undetected reflux in pervious images. Any urine left in the bladder after peeing is also recorded in this image. Lateral views is useful to evaluate any fistula from the bladder connecting into the rectum or vagina. Oblique views is used to evaluate any leaks from the bladder or urethra. Stress views are useful in urodynamic studies. Verumontanum appears elongated and proximal bulbal urethra has less conical appearance.

Complications 
Children may have painful micturition after the procedure, which can lead to urinary retention (children afraid to pee due to pain). Some painkillers or peeing inside a warm bath may help. Those children who receive antibiotics before the procedure for urinary tract infection will double the dose for 3 days after the procedure. Those not already on antibiotics will be prescribed with 3 days of trimethoprim. Haematuria (blood in urine) may also occur after the procedure. The procedure is invasive and uncomfortable, and carries a high potential for psychological trauma for both children and their parents.    With respect to post-procedural urinary tract infection, the risk has been found to be sufficiently low, except in patients with a pre-existing urologic diagnosis, that pre-operative antibiotic use is not considered a necessary adjunct.

Other complications is perforation of urinary bladder due to overdistension. This condition can be avoided by using non-retaining urinary catheter of Jacques. Accidental catherisation of vagina or unusual urethral opening and retention of urinary catheter are also possible.

An increased risk of cancer, in particular genitourinary cancer, has been observed in one study arising from the radiation exposure inherent in the procedure.

See also 
Posterior urethral valves
Benign prostatic hyperplasia
Cystography

References

External links 
Voiding cystourethrogram - National Library of Medicine

Urologic imaging
Radiography